Crazy Heart: Original Motion Picture Soundtrack is a 2010 film soundtrack album to accompany the film Crazy Heart directed by Scott Cooper starring Jeff Bridges and Maggie Gyllenhaal.

Songwriters
The album was released January 19, 2010 to accompany the film. The 16-track album contains several songs written by T-Bone Burnett, Stephen Bruton, and Ryan Bingham, with some by John Goodwin, Bob Neuwirth, Sam Hopkins, Gary Nicholson, Townes Van Zandt, Sam Phillips, Greg Brown, Billy Joe Shaver, and Eddy Shaver.

Performers
The songs are performed by various artists including actors Jeff Bridges, Colin Farrell, and Robert Duvall, as well as singers Ryan Bingham (who also sings the theme song "The Weary Kind"), Buck Owens, The Louvin Brothers, Lightnin' Hopkins, Waylon Jennings, Townes Van Zandt, and Sam Phillips.

Awards and nominations
On January 17, 2010, the theme song "The Weary Kind", written by Ryan Bingham and T-Bone Burnett, was awarded the Golden Globe for Best Original Song at the 67th Golden Globe Awards. The song also won the Academy Award for Best Original Song at the 82nd Academy Awards and a Grammy for Best Song Written For Motion Picture, Television Or Other Visual Media at the 53rd Grammy Awards. The soundtrack also won a Grammy for Best Compilation Soundtrack Album For Motion Picture, Television Or Other Visual Media at the same ceremony.

Track listing

Limited Deluxe Edition
"Hold On You"        2:53
"Hello Trouble"        1:52
"My Baby's Gone"        2:46
"Somebody Else (Instrumental)"        1:56
Performed by Stephen Bruton
"Somebody Else"        4:38
"I Don't Know"        2:23
"Wesley's Piano"        1:24
Performed by  Thomas Canning
"Fallin' & Flyin'"        3:02
"Searching (For Someone Like You)"        2:38
Performed by Kitty Wells
"I Don't Know"        2:16
"Once a Gambler"        4:56
"Are You Sure Hank Done It This Way"        2:55
"I Let the Freight Train Carry Me On"        2:34
Performed by The Delmore Brothers
"Color of the Blues"        2:52
Performed by George Jones
"Joy"        4:07
Performed by Lucinda Williams
"Fallin' & Flyin'"        2:43
"Gone, Gone, Gone"        2:39
"If I Needed You"        3:36
"Reflecting Light"        3:21
"Mal Hombre"        3:31
Performed by Lydia Mendoza
"Live Forever"        :50
"Brand New Angel"        3:49
"The Weary Kind (Theme From Crazy Heart)"        4:16

Charts

Weekly charts

Year-end charts

References

2010 soundtrack albums
New West Records soundtracks
Country music soundtracks
Grammy Award for Best Compilation Soundtrack for Visual Media
Drama film soundtracks